Anversois was a  74-gun ship of the line of the French Navy.

Career 
Ordered on 24 April 1804, Anversois was one of the ships built in the various shipyards captured by the First French Empire in Holland and Italy in a crash programme to replenish the ranks of the French Navy.

In 1807, she crossed from Antwerp to Vlissingen for a refit. In 1814, she took part in the defence of the city, attacking the forts Frederick Henry on 21 March and Lacroix the next day.

At the Bourbon Restoration, she was renamed to Éole, returned to her original name during the Hundred Days, and  Éole back again in 1815. In 1818, she was found to be in such poor state that she could not be used even as a hulk, and was broken up.

Notes, citations, and references

Notes

Citations

References

Ships of the line of the French Navy
Téméraire-class ships of the line
1807 ships